Street Legal may refer to:

Street-Legal (album), a 1978 album by Bob Dylan
Street Legal (Canadian TV series), a Canadian television series which aired from 1987 to 1994 and in 2019
Street Legal (New Zealand TV series), a New Zealand television series which aired from 2000 to 2005
Street Legal (video game), a racing game developed by Invictus and published by Activision

See also
Street-legal vehicle, a vehicle legal for use on public roads